Gesine is a German feminine given name and may refer to:

Gesine Becker (1888–1968), left wing German activist and politician
Gesine Bullock-Prado (born 1970), American pastry chef, TV personality, author, attorney, and former film executive
Gesine Cukrowski (born 1968), German actress
Gesine Lötzsch (born 1961), German politician of the left-wing party Die Linke
Gesine Manuwald, Professor of Latin and Head of the Department of Greek and Latin at University College London
Gesine Meißner (born 1952), German politician, Member of the European Parliament (MEP) from 2009 to 2019
Gesine Reinert, University Professor in Statistics at the University of Oxford
Gesine Ruge, German sprint canoeist who has competed since the mid-2000s
Gesine Schröder (born 1957), German musicologist and music theorist
Gesine Schwan (born 1943), German political science professor, member of the Social Democratic Party of Germany
Gesine Walther (born 1962), retired German sprinter

See also
The Treasure of Gesine Jacobsen (German: Der Schatz der Gesine Jakobsen), a 1923 German silent drama film
Gezin
Gęsin
Gęzyn
Jessine

 German feminine given names